RAK or rak may refer to:

Places
RAK, IATA airport code for Marrakesh Menara Airport, in Morocco
Ras Al Khaimah, the northernmost of the United Arab Emirates
Rak Rural District, in Kohgiluyeh and Boyer-Ahmad Province, Iran
Rak, Iran, a village in Rak Rural District
Rak, Kuyavian-Pomeranian Voivodeship, a village in north-central Poland
Rak (river), in Slovenia

Other 
FB PM-63 "RAK", a Polish 9 mm submachine gun
Rak, a creature in the Wizard of Oz books
RAK, a runestone style 980-1015 CE
Rak, a villain in the 2010 video game James Bond 007: Blood Stone
RAK, CD in special release of Konk (album) by The Kooks
RAK Records
RAK Studios, a recording studio near Regent's Park, London, England
Rak (surname)
, a bibliographic cataloging standard